The 2015–16 Big Bash League season was the fifth season of the Big Bash League, the top-level Twenty20 cricket competition in Australia. Each team signed a minimum of 18 players, including two rookie contracts and two visa contacted players.

Adelaide Strikers

Brisbane Heat

Hobart Hurricanes

Melbourne Renegades

Melbourne Stars

Perth Scorchers

Sydney Sixers

Sydney Thunder

References

2015–16 Big Bash League
Big Bash League cricketers
Big Bash League lists